Rick House (born May 18, 1957, in Burnaby, British Columbia) is a former professional Canadian football player who was a receiver for the Winnipeg Blue Bombers of the Canadian Football League from 1979 to 1984 and 1989 to 1991. He also played for the Edmonton Eskimos. He won two Grey Cups with the Bombers, in 1984 and 1990, in addition to one with the Eskimos in 1987. He was selected as one of the Blue Bombers All-Time Greats being inducted into the Winnipeg Blue Bomber Hall of Fame. Now living in Winnipeg, Manitoba with his wife Joanie House, and their three sons Mitchell, Bradley, and Jeff.

Notes

1957 births
Living people
Canadian football slotbacks
Edmonton Elks players
Players of Canadian football from British Columbia
Simon Fraser Clan football players
Sportspeople from Burnaby
Winnipeg Blue Bombers players